Boubeker Athmani (born November 11, 1981 in Berrahel, Algeria) is a football player who is currently playing as a forward for USM Annaba in the Algerian league.

Club career
 1999-2006 USM Annaba 
 2006-2008 JS Kabylie 
 2008-pres. USM Annaba

External links

 JS Kabylie Profile
 DZFoot Profile

1981 births
Algerian footballers
Living people
JS Kabylie players
USM Annaba players
Algeria under-23 international footballers
MO Constantine players
People from Annaba Province
Association football forwards
21st-century Algerian people